Ṣa may refer to:

Ṣa (Indic), a consonantal letter in Indic scripts
Sa (Mandaeism), a type of Mandaean sacramental bread that is rolled up

See also
SA (disambiguation)